Manuel Orantes defeated the defending champion Jimmy Connors in the final, 6–4, 6–3, 6–3 to win the men's singles tennis title at the 1975 US Open. Orantes became the first man in the Open Era to win the US Open after saving match points en route, saving five against Guillermo Vilas in the semifinals.

This was the first edition of the US Open to be contested on clay courts, previously being played on grass courts.

Format
Unlike the previous year, the first three rounds were best of three sets.

Seeds
The seeded players are listed below. Manuel Orantes is the champion; others show the round in which they were eliminated.

  Jimmy Connors (finalist)
  Guillermo Vilas (semifinalist)
  Manuel Orantes (champion)
  Arthur Ashe (fourth round)
  Björn Borg (semifinalist)
  Tom Okker (second round)
  Tony Roche (second round)
  Ilie Năstase (quarterfinalist)
  Rod Laver (fourth round)
  Roscoe Tanner (third round)
  Raúl Ramírez (fourth round)
  John Alexander (second round)
  Harold Solomon (fourth round)
  Vitas Gerulaitis (second round)
  Jan Kodeš (fourth round)
  Cliff Richey (second round)

Draw

Key
 Q = Qualifier
 WC = Wild card
 LL = Lucky loser
 r = Retired

Final eight

Section 1

Section 2

Section 3

Section 4

Section 5

Section 6

Section 7

Section 8

External links
 Association of Tennis Professionals (ATP) – 1975 US Open Men's Singles draw
1975 US Open – Men's draws and results at the International Tennis Federation

Men's singles
US Open (tennis) by year – Men's singles